The 16th Senate District of Wisconsin is one of 33 districts in the Wisconsin State Senate.  Located in south-central Wisconsin, the district comprises much of eastern Dane County.  It contains the east side of Wisconsin's capital city, Madison, as well as the cities of Monona and Sun Prairie, and the northern half of the city of Fitchburg.

Current elected officials
Melissa Agard is the senator representing the 16th district. She was first elected in the 2020 general election. Before serving as senator, she served in the Wisconsin State Assembly from 2013 to 2021, representing Madison's north side.

Each Wisconsin State Senate district is composed of three Wisconsin State Assembly districts.  The 16th Senate district comprises the 46th, 47th, and 48th Assembly districts.  The current representatives of those districts are: 
 Assembly District 46: Melissa Ratcliff (D–Cottage Grove)
 Assembly District 47: Jimmy P. Anderson (D–Fitchburg)
 Assembly District 48: Samba Baldeh (D–Madison)

The district is located entirely within Wisconsin's 2nd congressional district, which is represented by U.S. Representative Mark Pocan.

Past senators
Notable past senators include:
 Christopher Latham Sholes, 1848-1850, "father of the typewriter"
 John Sharpstein, 1852, Justice of the Supreme Court of California
 Nelson Dewey, 1854-1856, 1st Governor of Wisconsin
 J. Allen Barber, 1856-1858, U.S. Congressman (1871-1875), 15th Speaker of the Wisconsin State Assembly
 George Cochrane Hazelton, 1868-1872, U.S. Congressman (1877-1883), 1st Attorney General for the District of Columbia
 John J. Blaine, 1909-1913, 24th Governor of Wisconsin, United States Senator (1927-1933)
 Gaylord Nelson, 1949-1958, 35th Governor of Wisconsin, United States Senator (1963-1981)
 Charles Chvala, 1985-2005, Majority Leader (1999-2002)
 Mark F. Miller, 2005-2021, Majority Leader (2012-2013)

The boundaries of districts have changed repeatedly over history. Previous politicians of a specific numbered district have represented a completely different geographic area, due to redistricting. In the original constitution of the State of Wisconsin, it is stated that "The towns of Southport, Pike, Pleasant Prairie, Paris, Bristol, Brighton, Salem and Wheatland, in the county of Racine, shall constitute the sixteenth senate district." (At that time, Racine County included what in 1850 would become Kenosha County; and the city later known as Kenosha was still called "Southport".)

References

External links
District Website
Senator Miller's website

Wisconsin State Senate districts
Columbia County, Wisconsin
Dane County, Wisconsin
Madison, Wisconsin
1848 establishments in Wisconsin